Elías Agustín Ramírez (born 2 May 2000) is an Argentine professional footballer who plays as a forward for Ferro Pico, on loan from Gimnasia La Plata.

Club career
Ramírez's youth career got underway with Club Salto Grande, before he signed for Gimnasia y Esgrima in 2016. He made the move into senior football in April 2019 under manager Darío Ortiz, coming off the substitutes bench in a Primera División victory at the Estadio Juan Carmelo Zerillo against Colón on 6 April 2019.

On 7 March 2022, Ramírez joined Torneo Federal A club Ferro Pico on a loan deal until the end of the year.

International career
Ramírez received numerous call-ups from the Argentina U19s, including for the 2018 South American Games in Bolivia.

Personal life
Ramírez's brother, Eric, is a professional footballer; he also started his career with Gimnasia y Esgrima.

Career statistics
.

References

External links

2000 births
Living people
People from Concordia, Entre Ríos
Argentine footballers
Argentina youth international footballers
Association football forwards
Argentine Primera División players
Torneo Federal A players
Club de Gimnasia y Esgrima La Plata footballers
Sportspeople from Entre Ríos Province